Baar railway station is a railway station in the Swiss canton of Zug, situated in the municipality of Baar. The station is located on the Thalwil–Arth-Goldau railway and is an intermediate stop for InterRegio trains from Zürich to Lucerne and on Zürich S-Bahn line S24. It is also the northern terminus of the Zug Stadtbahn S1 line.

Services 
 the following services stop at Baar:

References

External links 
 
 

Railway stations in the canton of Zug
Swiss Federal Railways stations